Curzon is an unincorporated community in Holt County, in the U.S. state of Missouri.

History
A post office called Curzon was established in 1881, and remained in operation until 1915. The community has the name of John C. Curzon, a pioneer settler.

References

Unincorporated communities in Holt County, Missouri
Unincorporated communities in Missouri